The Jamestown Jackals are a professional basketball team in Jamestown, New York, United States, and members of The Basketball League (TBL).

History
The Jamestown Jackals were founded in 2015 by Kayla Crosby and joined the minor professional Premier Basketball League (PBL) for the 2016 season. After the 2017 season, the PBL folded. The Jackals then played the 2018 season in the semi-professional North American Basketball League (NABL) as part of a new Northeast Division. The Jackals won the division title in April 2018 to advance to the league championship, where they lost to the Dallas Mustangs.

On August 29, 2018, The Basketball League (TBL) announced the Jackals would join the rebranded league for the 2019 season. After one season, Jackals owner and general manager Kayla Crosby was named the director of team development for The Basketball League.

Current roster

References

Sports in Jamestown, New York
Basketball teams in New York (state)
The Basketball League teams
 2015 establishments in New York (state)
Basketball teams established in 2015